Sunshine is an album from Christian duo Jeff & Sheri Easter. It was released on September 28, 2004.

Track listing

All songs written by Sheri Easter, except where noted.
 "Why Don't You Try Jesus?" - 3:13
 "He Can't See My Past" (Bowman, Isaacs, Wilburn) - 2:58
 "Sunshine" (Isaacs Bowman, Isaacs) - 3:53
 "Guilty" (Hawkins, McBride LaBar) - 4:03
 "We Are Broken" (Isaacs, Shamblin) - 3:00
 "It's My Time" - 3:27
 "His Heart's Already Home (Pop's Song)" - 3:42
 "You're My Best Friend" (Holyfield) - 2:53
 "Live Like That" (Beck, Johnson, White) - 4:17
 "In the Garden" (Miles) - 3:35
 "River of Jordan" - 2:19

Awards

The album was nominated to a Dove Award for Country Album of the Year at the 36th GMA Dove Awards.

References

2004 albums